Diaphantes is an extinct genus of ray-finned fish belonging to the family Trichodontidae, the sandfishes. Its only species Diaphantes tilesii, was found in the Upper Miocene of Sakhalin in the northwestern Pacific Ocean.

References

Trichodontidae
Prehistoric ray-finned fish genera